Synagris is an Afrotropical genus of large potter wasps. Several Synagris wasps are strongly sexually dimorphic and males bear notable morphological secondary sexual traits including metasomal lamellar or angular protruding structures and hornlike or tusklike mandibular and/or clypeal projections.

The few species of Synagris with known biology are also notable for guarding their nests and even attending and feeding their larvae during their development (progressive provisioning), a primitively social behavior unusual among eumenines, which normally practice mass provisioning.

There are 3 subgenera and 24 species currently recognized, with many species formerly in the genus now removed to the genera Pseudagris and Rhynchagris.

Species 
Subgenus Hypagris de Saussure, 1855
 Synagris abyssinica Guerin, 1848
 Synagris aestuans (Fabricius, 1781)
 Synagris analis Saussure, 1856
 Synagris biplagiata Gusenleitner, 2005
 Synagris calida (Linnaeus, 1758)
 Synagris crassipes Kohl, 1894
 Synagris elephas Andre, 1895
 Synagris fasciata Mocsary, 1903
 Synagris kohli Maidl, 1914
 Synagris maxillosa Saussure, 1863
 Synagris mirabilis Guerin, 1848
 Synagris negusi Buysson, 1906
 Synagris rubescens Giordani Soika, 1989
 Synagris spiniventris (Illiger, 1802)
 Synagris spinosuscula Saussure, 1852
 Synagris stridens Giordani Soika, 1987

Subgenus Paragris de Saussure, 1855
 Synagris huberti Saussure, 1856
 Synagris ornatissima Maidl, 1914
 Synagris parvula Schulthess, 1928
 Synagris rufopicta Tullgren, 1904

Subgenus Synagris Latreille, 1802
 Synagris cornuta (Linnaeus, 1758)
 Synagris fulva Mocsary, 1903
 Synagris proserpina Gribodo, 1891
 Synagris similis Maidl, 1914

References

 Bequaert, J. 1918. Vespidae of the Belgian Congo. Bulletin of the American Museum of Natural History 39: 1–384.

External links
 ucalgaryca

Potter wasps
Hymenoptera genera